Romeoville is a village in Will County, Illinois, United States. Per the 2020 census, the population was 39,863. It is located in the southwest suburban area of Chicago near Interstate 55 and Interstate 355.

Geography

Climate
Romeoville is home to a National Weather Service forecast office, although bulletins issued by said office begin, "The National Weather Service in Chicago..."

Demographics

2020 census

Note: the US Census treats Hispanic/Latino as an ethnic category. This table excludes Latinos from the racial categories and assigns them to a separate category. Hispanics/Latinos can be of any race.

Economy

Romeoville is home to over 600 businesses. In 2013, the village won a Gold Medal from the International Economic Development Council and Atlas Integrated in the High Performance Economic Development category. They earned the award by creating 1,560 jobs during 2012/2013, which was the most for a town with a population between 25,001 to 100,000.

Top employers

According to the village website, the top employers in the village are:

Other major employers include Kehe Foods, FedEx Ground, and the Village of Romeoville.

Education

K-12 education
Romeoville residents attend the following schools:

Valley View School District 365U
Valley View Early Childhood Center
Beverly Skoff Elementary School
Irene King Elementary School
Kenneth L. Hermansen Elementary School
Robert C. Hill Elementary School
A. Vito Martinez Middle School
John J. Lukancic Middle School 
 Romeoville High School
 St. Andrew the Apostle School

Plainfield Community Consolidated School District 202

Eichelberger Elementary School
Creekside Elementary School
Lakewood Falls Elementary School
John F Kennedy Middle School
Indian Trails Middle School
Plainfield East High School

Lockport Township High School District 205
Lockport Township High School

Higher education
Joliet Junior College - Romeoville Campus
Rasmussen College - Romeoville Campus
Lewis University - Main Campus

Infrastructure

Transportation

Metra station on the Heritage Corridor line. 
Lewis University Airport for basic aircraft to Boeing Business class.
Pace bus route 834.

Major highways
Major highways in Romeoville include:

Interstate Highways
 Interstate 55
 Interstate 355

US Highways
 Historic US 66

Illinois Highways
 Route 7
 Route 53

Notable people

 Gerald Coleman, played goalie for the Lake Erie Monsters and Tampa Bay Lightning.
 Egotistico Fantastico, pro wrestler
 Oliver Gibson, DT, played with the Pittsburgh Steelers and the Cincinnati Bengals.
 Antonio Morrison, LB, played with the Indianapolis Colts and Green Bay Packers.
 Byron Stingily, OT, played with the Tennessee Titans and Pittsburgh Steelers.

References

External links

 
Villages in Will County, Illinois
Chicago metropolitan area
Villages in Illinois
Majority-minority cities and towns in Will County, Illinois